Wong Yim Kwan (born 1 August 1992 in Hong Kong) is a former Hong Kong professional footballer.

Club career

Tai Po
Wong joined Tai Po youth academy when he was young and was promoted to the first team in the 2009–10 season. He rarely got chance to play and therefore was loaned to Hong Kong Sapling in the 2011–12 season. He returned to Tai Po in July 2012. However, Tai Po was relegated to the Second Division and he chose to leave the club.

Happy Valley
Wong joined newly promoted First Division club Happy Valley on a free transfer.

Sun Pegasus
On 30 December 2013, it was announced that Wong had signed with Sun Pegasus alongside Australian player Marko Jesic.

Lee Man
Following two seasons with Yuen Long, Wong signed with Lee Man on 17 July 2018.

Career statistics

Club
 As of 4 May 2013

Notes 
1.  Others include Hong Kong Season Play-offs.

Honours
Tai Po
 * Hong Kong Senior Shield: 2012–13

Yuen Long
Hong Kong Senior Shield: 2017–18 

Lee Man
 Hong Kong Sapling Cup: 2018–19

References

External links
 
 Wong Yim Kwan at HKFA
 

1992 births
Living people
Association football midfielders
Association football defenders
Hong Kong footballers
Tai Po FC players
Happy Valley AA players
Dreams Sports Club players
Yuen Long FC players
Lee Man FC players
Hong Kong First Division League players
Hong Kong Premier League players